The Big Tour was the second concert tour by English musical duo Wham!, launched in support of their multi-platinum second studio album Make It Big with over six million units sold in the US alone. The tour spanned 4 months between December 1984 and April 1985, comprising 39 shows across the UK, Ireland, Japan, Australia, United States, Hong Kong and China. Wham! made history in China and achieved worldwide publicity by being the first Western pop act to visit the country.

Overview
The Big Tour opened at Whitley Bay Ice Rink on 4 December. The venue was small due to no other venues being available in the north east, they were booked for two more shows between concerts in Glasgow, Dublin and Leeds. Just as the UK portion of the tour was in its stride, George Michael hurt his back during a performance and the band had to cancel five consecutive shows which were put back until February and March. They continued the UK leg with shows in Wembley Arena during the Christmas period to around 50,000 fans during which “Last Christmas” reached number two in the UK Singles Chart.

The new year began the tour in Japan performing in the Fukuoka Sunpalace with other dates in Osaka, Nagoya, Tokyo and Yokohama. In Australia, five shows followed in Melbourne and Sydney before continuing in the United States, with a sellout concert at the Palladium in front of 4,400 in February 1985. Wham! returned to the United Kingdom with earlier dates having been rescheduled.

Following a month break, the tour resumed in Hong Kong on 2 April 1985. The 10-day visit to China was the first by a Western pop group. The excursion was a publicity scheme devised by Simon Napier-Bell (one of their two managers—Jazz Summers being the other). It began with a concert at the Peoples' Gymnasium in Beijing (then Peking) in front of 13,000 people. They also played a concert in front of 5,000 in Canton. The two concerts were played without compensation.
Wham!'s visit to China attracted huge media attention across the world. Napier-Bell later admitted that he used cunning tactics to sabotage the efforts of British rock band Queen to be the first to play in China: he made two brochures for the Chinese authorities – one featuring Wham! fans as pleasant middle-class youngsters, and one portraying Queen lead singer Freddie Mercury in typically flamboyant poses. The Chinese opted for Wham!.

Recordings
A documentary film was shot over two weeks in April and edited over summer and autumn 1985 in London. The whole China visit was documented by British film director Lindsay Anderson and producer Martin Lewis in their film Wham! in China: Foreign Skies released in 1986. The first ever public viewing of Foreign Skies was shown on large video screens on Saturday 28 June 1986 at the farewell show "The Final".

Support acts
DJ Gary Crowley
Pepsi & Shirlie

Set list

Japan

 "Wake Me Up Before You Go-Go"
 "Club Tropicana"
 "Blue"
 "Heartbeat"
 "Credit Card Baby"
 "If You Were There" 
 "Like a Baby"
 "Wham Rap! (Enjoy What You Do?)"
 "Freedom"
 "Careless Whisper"
 "Young Guns (Go for It!)"
Encore
 "Wake Me Up Before You Go-Go"
 "Last Christmas"

Beijing, China
"Bad Boys"
"Club Tropicana"
"Blue"
"Wake Me Up Before You Go-Go"
"A Ray of Sunshine"
"Young Guns (Go for It!)"
"Careless Whisper"
"Everything She Wants"
"Like a Baby"
"If You Were There"
"Love Machine"

Tour dates
Tour dates as printed in the official Big Tour 1984-85 tour programme.

Box office score data

Personnel

George Michael & Andrew Ridgeley
Gary Crowley - Crowd DJ (Guest Star)
Tommy Eyre - M.D. & Keyboards
Trevor Murrell - Drums
Deon Estus - Bass
Hugh Burns - Guitars
Mark Fisher - Keyboards
Danny Cummings - Percussion 
Paul Spong - Trumpet 
Dave ‘Baps’ Baptiste - Saxophone
Raul D’Oliviera - Trumpet
Leroy Osbourne - Vocals 
Janey Hallett - Vocals 
Janet Mooney - Vocals 
Shirlie Holliman - Dancer 
Pepsi DeMacque - Dancer
Simon Napier-Bell - Management 
Jazz Summers - Management 

Jake Duncan - Tour Manager
Ken Watts - Production Manager 
Dave Davis - Guitars & Keyboards 
Dick Jones - Drums & Percussion
Tony Blanc - Sound Engineer
John Roden - Monitor Engineer
John ‘Judge’ Loudon - Lighting Engineer 
Ross Balfour - Staging
Russell Sparks - Staging 
Lesley Morrall - Wardrobe 
Melanie Panayiotou - Wardrobe 
Yioda Panayiotou - Make-up & Hairdressing 
Dave Moulder - Personal Security 
Ronnie Franklin - Personal Security 
Connie Filippello - Press & P.R.
Mike Putland - Photographer
Mr & Mrs. Panos
Mrs. Jenny Ridgeley
Mrs. Tommy Eyre
Ms. Debbie Sweeny

See also
Wham! discography
George Michael discography

References 

George Michael concert tours
1984 concert tours
1985 concert tours